Henrik Gustavsen (born 8 April 1992) is a Norwegian footballer who played most of his career for Notodden, as a midfielder.

Career
Gustavsen joined Sandefjord Fotball in 2009, from Halsen IF. He later signed his professional contract with the club, and  made his debut for Sandefjord in the Tippeligaen on 21 March 2010, in a 3-1 home victory against Molde FK, replacing Panajotis Dimitriadis in the dying minutes of the match. Gustavsen played in 15 matches for Sandefjord, with his club being relegated.

Moving on to Notodden FK, he played 198 matches across all competitions and served as captain in their 2021 2. divisjon season, before leaving the club in late 2021. He was subsequently hired as head coach of Sandefjord U16.

References

External links
Sandefjord official profile 

1992 births
Living people
Sportspeople from Tønsberg
Norwegian footballers
Association football midfielders
Norway youth international footballers
Sandefjord Fotball players
Notodden FK players
Eliteserien players
Norwegian First Division players
Sandefjord Fotball non-playing staff